XHAN-FM is a radio station in Ocotlán, Jalisco, Mexico.  Transmitting at a frequency of 91.1 MHz on the FM band, it broadcasts daily with a schedule of popular music, grupera, and news. The station's offices are located at 215 Zaragoza in Ocotlán's historic downtown.

History

XEAN-AM on 800 kHz received its concession on April 22, 1950. It was a daytimer with 1,000 watts owned by Radio Ocotlán, S.A. Nighttime broadcasts at 100 watts began in the 1990s. The current concessionaire was formed in 2006 and FM was added in 2011.

References

Radio stations in Jalisco